Bea Toivonen (born 28 October 1992) is a Finnish model and beauty pageant titleholder who was crowned Miss Finland 2014 and represented Finland at the Miss Universe 2014 pageant.

Personal life
Toivonen was born in 1992. Her mother, Marja Kinnunen, is a former Miss Suomi and represented Finland at Miss Universe 1985. Toivonen is a hairdresser and make-up artist. Bea's father Harri Toivonen is a former rally driver. Her uncle was Henri Toivonen who was also a rally driver.

Pageantry

Miss Finland 2014
Toivonen represented Jyväskylä and was crowned Miss Finland 2014 on 4 May 2014 at a ceremony held at Langvik Congress Wellness Hotel in Kirkkonummi. The pageant was broadcast live on national television and received extensive coverage in the tabloid press.

Miss Universe 2014
Toivonen competed at the Miss Universe 2014 but was unplaced.

References

External links
Official Miss Suomi website

1993 births
Living people
Miss Universe 2014 contestants
People from Jyväskylä
Miss Finland winners
Finnish female models